Khairy is an Arab-based given name and surname. Notable persons with the name or surname include:

People with the given name
Khairy Beshara (born 1947), Egyptian film director
Khairy Hirzalla, Jordanian painter
Khairy Jamaluddin (born 1976), commonly known as KJ, Malaysian politician and government minister
Sheikh Khairy Khedr (????-2014), Founder and commander of the Yezidi militia Malik Al-Tawus, which later became known as the Sinjar Resistance
Khairy Shalaby (1938-2011), Egyptian novelist and writer
Khairy Alzahaby (born 1946), Syrian novelist and thinker, historian and columnist and scenarist

People with the surname
Abla Khairy (born 1961), Egyptian swimmer
Ahmed Khairy (athlete), Egyptian sprinter
Ahmed Khairy (footballer), Egyptian footballer
Ahmed Khairy (handballer), Egyptian handball player
Mohamed Khairy (born 1981), Egyptian snooker player
Mohamed Khairy (equestrian) (born 1919), Egyptian equestrian
Najat El-Khairy, Canadian artist of Palestinian origin, collector and lecturer on Palestinian embroidery

See also
Khairy Pasha Palace, neo-Mamluk building and former palace of Khairy Pasha in Cairo,